( is a municipality and village in Frýdek-Místek District in the Moravian-Silesian Region of the Czech Republic. It has about 1,000 inhabitants.

Polish minority makes up 16.3% of the population.

Geography
Písečná lies in the historical region of Cieszyn Silesia. The western part of the municipality lies in the Jablukov Furrow, the eastern part lies in the Silesian Beskids mountain range.

History
The first written mention of Písečná is from 1446. Until 2000 it was an administrative part of Jablunkov.

References

External links

 

Villages in Frýdek-Místek District
Cieszyn Silesia